Elizabeth Young may refer to:

Elizabeth Young, Lady Kennet (1923–2014), British writer
Elizabeth Young (actress) (1913–2007), American film actress of the 1930s
Elizabeth Young (author),  chick lit and contemporary romance writer
Elizabeth Young (contralto) (1730s–1773), English opera singer and actress
Elizabeth Young (journalist) (1950–2001), English literary critic and author
Elizabeth Younge (1740–1797), English actress

See also
Sally Blane (born Elizabeth Jane Young; 1910–1997), American actress
Eliza R. Snow (1804–1887), American Latter-day Saint, a plural wife of Brigham Young
Beth Young, a fictional character on Desperate Housewives
Betty Young, American educator
Betty Lou Young, American writer and conservationist
John Quincy Adams and Elizabeth Young House, in Washington County, Oregon